Deiva Kuzhandhaigal is a 1973 Indian Tamil-language drama film directed by S. P. Muthuraman and written by V. C. Guhanathan. The film stars Jaishankar, R. Muthuraman and Jaya, with Sridevi, Master Ramu and Jayaseelan in supporting roles. It was released on 14 September 1973, and failed at the box office.

Plot

Cast 
 Jaishankar
 R. Muthuraman
 Jaya
 Sridevi
 Master Ramu
 Jayaseelan

Soundtrack 
The music was composed by V. Kumar, with lyrics by Kannadasan and Panchu Arunachalam.

Release and reception 
Deiva Kuzhandhaigal was released on 14 September 1973. Kanthan of Kalki lauded the performances of Jaishankar, Jaya, Sridevi and Ramu, along with Muthuraman's direction, but criticised the performance of Muthuraman, and the screenplay. In Sridevi: The Eternal Screen Goddess (2019), Satyarth Nayak applauded Sridevi's performance in the scene where her character eulogises Indian history during a school play, and her "climactic death scene".

References

External links 
 

1970s Tamil-language films
1973 drama films
Films directed by S. P. Muthuraman
Films scored by V. Kumar
Films with screenplays by V. C. Guhanathan
Indian drama films